The Supercopa de Catalunya (Catalonia Supercup) is a football supercup competition organised by the Catalan Football Federation since 2014 for football clubs in the Catalonia autonomous community of Spain. The match features the two best ranked Catalan clubs from La Liga.

Matches

Winners

See also
 Copa Catalunya
 Copa del Rey
 Euskal Herriko Futbol Txapelketa

References

 
Catalan football competitions
Football cup competitions in Spain
Catalunya